Adam Hloušek (born 20 December 1988) is a Czech professional footballer who last played as a left-back for Trinity Zlín. He was also a member of the Czech Republic national team.

Career
In 2009, Hloušek won the Talent of the Year award at the Czech Footballer of the Year awards.

For the 2014–15 season he moved to VfB Stuttgart. On 31 January 2016, he joined Legia Warsaw.

In August 2020, Hloušek returned to former club 1. FC Kaiserslautern, joining on loan from Viktoria Plzeň.

On 3 July 2021, he joined the Polish Ekstraklasa side Bruk-Bet Termalica Nieciecza. On 5 January 2022, he left the club by mutual consent.

In January 2022, Hloušek returned to the Czech First League, he joined FC Fastav Zlín.

References

External links
 
 
 
 

1988 births
Living people
People from Turnov
Association football midfielders
Czech footballers
Czech Republic youth international footballers
Czech Republic under-21 international footballers
Czech Republic international footballers
Czech expatriate footballers
FK Jablonec players
SK Slavia Prague players
1. FC Kaiserslautern players
1. FC Nürnberg players
VfB Stuttgart players
Legia Warsaw players
FC Viktoria Plzeň players
Bruk-Bet Termalica Nieciecza players
Czech First League players
Bundesliga players
Ekstraklasa players
Expatriate footballers in Germany
Expatriate footballers in Poland
Czech expatriate sportspeople in Poland
Czech expatriate sportspeople in Germany
FC Fastav Zlín players
Sportspeople from the Liberec Region